Daniel Boone Area High School is located in Birdsboro, Pennsylvania, part of the Daniel Boone Area School District in south-eastern Berks County. The sports and academic teams compete as the "Blazers", and the school colors are Carolina blue and white. As of the 2017–2018 school year, there were 1,143 students enrolled at the school.

Extracurriculars
Daniel Boone Area School District offers a wide variety of clubs, activities and an extensive sports program.

Sports
The school competes in the PIAA class AAAAA (5A) category in the following sports:

According to PIAA directory July 2013

Notable alumni
Wayne Ellington - professional basketball player for the New York Knicks
Richie Kotzen - Class of 1988; guitar virtuoso and former member of Poison
Carmelo Marrero - wrestler; professional mixed martial arts fighter

References

External links 
 Daniel Boone Area High School
 Daniel Boone Area School District

Public high schools in Pennsylvania
Schools in Berks County, Pennsylvania